Megatibicen dorsatus, known generally as the bush cicada or giant grassland cicada, is a species of cicada in the family Cicadidae.

Notes
M. dorsatus is endemic to the tallgrass prairies of the central United States. Adult males are host to the acoustically hunting sarcophagid parasitoid, Emblemasoma erro.

References

Further reading

External links

 

Insects described in 1825
Cryptotympanini